The Government of Nagaland also known as the State Government of Nagaland, or locally as State Government, is the governing authority of the India state of Nagaland and its 16 districts. It consists of an executive, led by the Governor of Nagaland, a judiciary and a legislative branch. Kohima is the capital of Nagaland, and houses the Vidhan Sabha (Legislative Assembly) and the secretariat.

Executive
Like other states in India, the head of state of Nagaland is the Governor, appointed by the President of India on the advice of the Central government. His or her post is largely ceremonial. The Chief Minister is the head of government and is vested with most of the executive powers. The Nagaland State Government declared the year, 2016 as the 'Year of the Construction Workers'.

Legislative
The present Nagaland Legislative Assembly is unicameral, consisting of 60 Member of the Legislative Assembly (M.L.A). Its term is 5 years, unless sooner dissolved.

Judicial
The Guwahati High Court, located in Guwahati, Assam has a Kohima Bench that exercises the jurisdiction and powers in respect of cases arising in the State of Nagaland.

District administration
Each of the sixteen districts of Nagaland has a Deputy Commissioner (DC). Districts may be further divided into "sub-divisions", each of which has an Additional Deputy Commissioner (ADC) in charge of administration. Larger sub-division may also require a number of Sub-Divisional Officers (SDOs) or Extra Assistant Commissioners (EACs) responsible for administrative circles within the sub-division.

References